Leachia pacifica is a species of squid in the family Cranchiidae., first described by Arturo Issel in 1908. It is mainly found in the Subtropics.  No subspecies are listed in the Catalogue of Life.

References 

Animals described in 1908
Squid